Vorniceni may refer to:

Vorniceni, Botoșani, a commune in Botoșani County, Romania
Vorniceni, Strășeni, a commune in Strășeni district, Moldova
Vorniceni, the Romanian name for Vornychany, Chernivtsi Oblast, Ukraine